
Orcococha (possibly from Quechua urqu male; mountain, qucha lake, "mountain lake" or "male lake") is a lake in Peru located in the Huancavelica Region, Castrovirreyna Province, Santa Ana District, and in the Huaytará Province, Pilpichaca District. It is situated east of Lake Choclococha and northwest of the smaller lake named Caracocha.

See also
List of lakes in Peru

References

INEI, Compendio Estadistica 2007, page 26

Lakes of Peru
Lakes of Huancavelica Region